Group Therapy is the sixth studio album by alternative rock band Concrete Blonde, following their break-up and reunion. The album was originally released on January 15, 2002, by Manifesto Records.

Track listing

Charts

References

Concrete Blonde albums
2002 albums